The 2021–22 season will be Vasas SC's 23rd competitive season, 4th consecutive season in the Merkantil Bank Liga and 110th year in existence as a football club.

Squad

Transfers

Summer

In:

Out:

Source:

Competitions

Overview

Nemzeti Bajnokság II

League table

Results summary

Results by round

Matches

Hungarian Cup

Appearances and goals 
Last updated on 5 December 2021.

|-
|colspan="14"|Youth players:

|-
|colspan="14"|Out to loan:
|-
|colspan="14"|Players no longer at the club:
|}

Top scorers
Includes all competitive matches. The list is sorted by shirt number when total goals are equal.
Last updated on 5 December 2021

Disciplinary record
Includes all competitive matches. Players with 1 card or more included only.

Last updated on 5 December 2021

Clean sheets
Last updated on 5 December 2021

References

External links
 Official Website
 UEFA
 fixtures and results

Vasas SC seasons
Vasas